The 2000 Nations Cup was a professional non-ranking snooker team tournament that took place at Telewest Arena in Newcastle upon Tyne, England, from 15 to 23 January 2000. It was the second edition of the Nations Cup. The competition was contested by five nations of four players each. The England team of Ronnie O'Sullivan, John Parrott, Stephen Lee and Jimmy White won the title with a 6–4 victory in the final over the Wales Team of Darren Morgan, Mark Williams, Matthew Stevens and Dominic Dale.

John Higgins compiled the 35th official maximum break in his round-robin match against Dennis Taylor.

Participants 
Below is a list of participating teams and players.

Round robin
Teams in bold indicate match winners.

Final

References

Nations Cup (snooker)
2000 in snooker
2000 in English sport
January 2000 sports events in the United Kingdom